Judaki (also Romanized as Jūdakī) is a village in Khandan Rural District, Tarom Sofla District, Qazvin County, Qazvin Province, Iran. At the 2006 census, its population was 155, in 29 families.

References 

Populated places in Qazvin County